This article provides information on candidates who stood for the 2001 Australian federal election. The election was held on 10 November 2001.

Redistributions and seat changes
Redistributions occurred in New South Wales, Western Australia and the Northern Territory.
In New South Wales, the Liberal-held seats of Macarthur and Parramatta became notionally Labor, while the Labor-held seat of Paterson became notionally Liberal.
In Western Australia, the notionally Labor seat of Hasluck was created.
The division of Northern Territory was split into the notionally Labor seat of Lingiari and the notionally CLP seat of Solomon. The sitting member, Warren Snowdon (Labor), contested Lingiari.

Retiring Members and Senators

Labor
 Colin Hollis MP (Throsby, NSW)
 Allan Morris MP (Newcastle, NSW)
 Neil O'Keefe MP (Burke, Vic)
Senator Barney Cooney (Vic)
Senator Rosemary Crowley (SA)
Senator Jim McKiernan (WA)
Senator Sue West (NSW)

Liberal
 John Fahey MP (Macarthur, NSW)
 Lou Lieberman MP (Indi, Vic)
 Peter Reith MP (Flinders, Vic)
 Michael Ronaldson MP (Ballarat, Vic)
 Kathy Sullivan MP (Moncrieff, Qld)
 Andrew Thomson MP (Wentworth, NSW)
 Michael Wooldridge MP (Casey, Vic)
Senator Jocelyn Newman (Tas)

National
 Tim Fischer MP (Farrer, NSW)
 Tony Lawler MP (Parkes, NSW)
 Garry Nehl MP (Cowper, NSW)

Country Liberal
 Senator Grant Tambling (NT)

House of Representatives
Sitting members at the time of the election are shown in bold text. Successful candidates are highlighted in the relevant colour. Where there is possible confusion, an asterisk (*) is also used.

Australian Capital Territory

New South Wales

Northern Territory

Queensland

South Australia

Tasmania

Victoria

Western Australia

Senate
Sitting senators are shown in bold text. Tickets that elected at least one Senator are highlighted in the relevant colour. Successful candidates are identified by an asterisk (*).

Australian Capital Territory
Two Senate places were up for election. The Labor Party was defending one seat. The Liberal Party was defending one seat.

New South Wales
Six Senate places were up for election. The Labor Party was defending two seats. The Liberal-National Coalition was defending three seats. The Australian Democrats were defending one seat. Senators John Faulkner (Labor), Michael Forshaw (Labor), Bill Heffernan (Liberal), Steve Hutchins (Labor), Aden Ridgeway (Democrats) and John Tierney (Liberal) were not up for re-election.

  Ex-members of One Nation
  Unregistered Communist Party of Australia
  Unregistered Socialist Alliance

Northern Territory
Two Senate places were up for election. The Labor Party was defending one seat. The Country Liberal Party was defending one seat.

Queensland
Six Senate places were up for election. The Labor Party was defending two seats. The Liberal Party was defending two seats. The National Party was defending one seat. The Australian Democrats were defending one seat. Senators George Brandis (Liberal), John Cherry (Democrats), Len Harris (One Nation), Joe Ludwig (Labor), Brett Mason (Liberal) and Jan McLucas (Labor) were not up for re-election.

South Australia
Six Senate places were up for election. The Labor Party was defending two seats. The Liberal Party was defending three seats. The Australian Democrats were defending one seat. Senators Nick Bolkus (Labor), Geoff Buckland (Labor), Alan Ferguson (Liberal), Meg Lees (Democrats), Nick Minchin (Liberal) and Amanda Vanstone (Liberal) were not up for re-election.

Tasmania
Six Senate places are up for election. The Labor Party was defending two seats. The Liberal Party was defending three seats. The Australian Greens were defending one seat. Senators Eric Abetz (Liberal), Kay Denman (Labor), Brian Gibson (Liberal), Brian Harradine (Independent), Shayne Murphy (Independent) and Kerry O'Brien (Labor) were not up for re-election.

Victoria
Six Senate places were up for election. The Labor Party was defending two seats. The Liberal-National Coalition was defending three seats. The Australian Democrats were defending one seat. Senators Kim Carr (Labor), Jacinta Collins (Labor), Stephen Conroy (Labor), Julian McGauran (National), Tsebin Tchen (Liberal) and Judith Troeth (Liberal) were not up for re-election.

Western Australia
Six Senate places were up for election. The Labor Party was defending two seats. The Liberal Party was defending three seats. The Australian Democrats were defending one seat. Senators Ian Campbell (Liberal), Peter Cook (Labor), Chris Ellison (Liberal), Chris Evans (Labor), Brian Greig (Democrats) and Sue Knowles (Liberal) were not up for re-election.

Summary by party 
Beside each party is the number of seats contested by that party in the House of Representatives for each state, as well as an indication of whether the party contested the Senate election in the respective state.

See also
 2001 Australian federal election
 Members of the Australian House of Representatives, 1998–2001
 Members of the Australian House of Representatives, 2001–2004
 Members of the Australian Senate, 1999–2002
 Members of the Australian Senate, 2002–2005
 List of political parties in Australia

References
 Australian Electoral Commission

2001 elections in Australia
Candidates for Australian federal elections